Sphecosoma perconstrictum is a moth in the subfamily Arctiinae. It was described by Zerny in 1912. It is found in Brazil.

References

Natural History Museum Lepidoptera generic names catalog

Moths described in 1912
Sphecosoma